Giovanni Demisiani (died 1614), a Greek from Zakynthos, was a theologian, chemist, mathematician to Cardinal Gonzaga, and member of the Accademia dei Lincei. Demisiani is noted for  coining the name telescope (from the Greek τῆλε, tele "far" and σκοπεῖν, skopein "to look or see") for a version of the instrument presented by Galileo Galilei to the Accademia dei Lincei at a banquet honoring Galileo’s induction into the Accademia in 1611.

See also
 List of Greek mathematicians

Notes

External links
 Short biography 

1614 deaths
Greek mathematicians
16th-century Greek people
Year of birth unknown
17th-century Greek scientists
17th-century Greek educators
16th-century Greek scientists
16th-century Greek educators
16th-century Greek mathematicians
17th-century Greek mathematicians
17th-century Greek astronomers
16th-century Greek astronomers
People from Zakynthos